The 1900 United Kingdom general election was held between 26 September and 24 October 1900, following the dissolution of Parliament on 25 September. Also referred to as the Khaki Election (the first of several elections to bear this sobriquet), it was held at a time when it was widely believed that the Second Boer War had effectively been won (though in fact it was to continue for another two years).

The Conservative Party, led by Lord Salisbury with their Liberal Unionist allies, secured a large majority of 134 seats, despite securing only 5.6% more votes than Henry Campbell-Bannerman's Liberals. This was largely owing to the Conservatives winning 163 seats that were uncontested by others. The Labour Representation Committee, later to become the Labour Party, participated in a general election for the first time. However, it had only been in existence for a few months; as a result, Keir Hardie and Richard Bell were the only LRC Members of Parliament elected in 1900.

This was the first occasion when Winston Churchill was elected to the House of Commons. He had stood in the same seat, Oldham, at a by-election held the previous year, but had lost. It was also the final general election of the Victorian era.

Results

|}

Voting summary

Seats summary

See also
List of MPs elected in the 1900 United Kingdom general election
Parliamentary franchise in the United Kingdom 1885–1918
1900 United Kingdom general election in Ireland

Notes

References

External links
Spartacus: Political Parties and Election Results
United Kingdom election results—summary results 1885–1979

Manifestos
1900 Conservative manifesto
1900 Labour manifesto
1900 Liberal manifesto

 
General election
1900
United Kingdom general election
United Kingdom general election
United Kingdom general election
Henry Campbell-Bannerman